Andra Teede (born 23 September 1988) is an Estonian poet and dramaturge.

Teede was born and raised in Tallinn. She studied Estonian language and literature at the University of Tartu before enrolling in the drama department of the Estonian Academy of Music and Theatre from which she graduated in 2014 with a degree in dramaturgy. 

Her poems have been published in collections including Contemporary Estonian Poetry (A Baltic Anthology Book 3) edited by Inara Cedrins. 

Since 2014 she has been the writer of the long-running Estonian television series Õnne 13 (13 Happiness Street).

Selected publications 

 (Tall men, long lives)

References

External links

 

1988 births
Living people
Estonian women poets
21st-century Estonian poets
Estonian screenwriters
Estonian dramatists and playwrights
21st-century Estonian writers
21st-century Estonian women writers
Estonian Academy of Music and Theatre alumni
University of Tartu alumni
Writers from Tallinn